Ram Swaroop Singh was an Indian politician and a former member of Uttar Pradesh Legislative Assembly. He also worked as Minister of State in the Mayawati's cabinet. He was elected first time in 2002 from Sarvankhera assembly constituency of Kanpur Dehat district.

Political life
He started his political life to participate in societies elections. He officiated the post of chairman of Zila Sahkari Bank Ltd. Kanpur, member of Zila
Panchayat Kanpur Dehat district. First time he fought assembly election in 1997 as independent candidate but he did not reach his goal. In 2002 he met Bahujan Samajwadi Party Supremo Mayawati and joined Bahujan Samajwadi Party and succeeded in finding ticket from BSP. In 2002 he fought assembly election from Sarwankheda constituency of district Kanpur Dehat as BSP candidate and became winner. He also officiated for some time as state minister in Mayawati government. 
In political turmoil he resigned from Mayawati government, his party BSP and joined Samajwadi Party. In 2007 and 2012 he fought elections as member of Legislative Assembly from Akbarpur-Raniya (Vidhan Sabha constituency) of district Kanpur Dehat (Ramabai Nagar) as Samajwadi Party candidate and he won seats. He was sitting MLA from Akbarpur-Raniya (Vidhan Sabha constituency)-206 of district Kanpur Dehat.

References

Living people
People from Kanpur
Samajwadi Party politicians
1937 births
Members of the Uttar Pradesh Legislative Assembly